Bert Thomas Gramly (born April 19, 1945 in Dallas, Texas) is a former Major League Baseball pitcher who played for one season. He pitched three games for the Cleveland Indians during the 1968 season.

External links

1945 births
Living people
Angelo State Rams baseball players
Major League Baseball pitchers
Cleveland Indians players
Baseball players from Dallas
TCU Horned Frogs baseball players